Pseudochromis nigrovittatus, the blackstripe dottyback, is a species of ray-finned fish from the Western Indian Ocean, which is a member of the family Pseudochromidae.

References

nigrovittatus
Taxa named by George Albert Boulenger
Fish described in 1897